Let the Truth Be Told is the ninth solo studio album by American rapper Z-Ro. It was released on April 12, 2005, through Rap-A-Lot Records, Asylum Records and Atlantic Records. Recording sessions took place at Dean's List House Of Hits in New York City, at Noddfactor Studios in Denton, at M.A.D. Studios and at King Of The Ghetto Studio in Houston. Production was handled by Mike Dean, Mr. Lee, Bigg Tyme, Cory Mo, Dani Kartel, Davion Botts, "The Beatmaster" Clay D and Z-Ro himself. It features guest appearances from Trae tha Truth, Ashanti, Devin the Dude, Juvenile, Lil' Boss, Lil' Flip and Paul Wall. The album peaked at number 69 on the Billboard 200 in the United States.

Track listing

Charts

References

External links

2005 albums
Z-Ro albums
Rap-A-Lot Records albums
Albums produced by Z-Ro
Albums produced by Mike Dean (record producer)